= Confederationist League =

Brazilian political organization

- Liga Confederacionista
- Formation: March 11, 1933
- Founder: René Thiollier; Alfredo Ellis Jr.

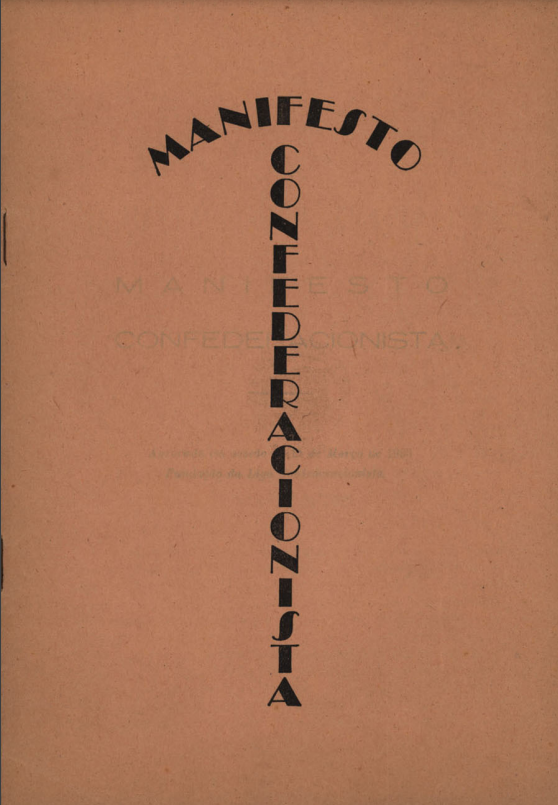
The manifesto of the Confederationist League

The Confederationist League (in Portuguese: Liga Confederacionista), founded in São Paulo by the most radical group of the Paulista Defense League, was a Brazilian political organization that sought to create a confederate State in the country, an alternative form to the separatism that began to grow in the State of São Paulo since the beginning of the Vargas Era.

According to the newspaper Correio de S.Paulo, in 1935 the organization had more than 18,000 members.
